Cord rig is the name given by archaeologists to a system of cultivation practised in prehistoric and later upland Britain.

Spades were used to excavate raised banks for cultivation with channels running alongside for drainage. Where it survives, it consists of parallel ridges of earth around 1 m wide and 0.15 m high. The presence of cord rig suggests nearby settlements and can be identified from aerial photography. 

In Northumberland, one example of cord rig has been identified running beneath, and therefore predating, Hadrian's Wall.

See also
 Celtic fields
 Lazy bed
 Run rig

References

History of agriculture in the United Kingdom